Perdrix may refer to:

 Perdrix (film), a 2019 French film
 French corvette Perdrix (1784)
 Pied De Perdrix, a synonym for the malbec grape
 Oeil de perdrix, a rosé wine produced in Switzerland
 Perdrix Formation,  a geologic formation of Late Devonian (Frasnian) age in the Western Canada Sedimentary Basin

People with the surname
 Jean Perdrix, French film director
 Roger Perdrix (born 1943), Canadian football player

See also
 Perdrix River (disambiguation)